The Iran women's national volleyball team is the national women's volleyball team of Iran.
Iran national volleyball team is one of volleyball teams in Asia which the captain is Zeinab Giveh and the most famous players are the setter Shabnam Alikhani and the middle blocker Farnoosh Sheikhi

Current roster

Head Coach: Alessandra Campedelli
The following is the Iranian roster

Tournament records

Asian Championship

Asian Games

Asian Cup

Islamic Solidarity Games

References

External links
Islamic Republic of Iran Volleyball Federation

National, Women's
National women's volleyball teams